A snowplow (also snow plow, snowplough or snow plough) is a device intended for mounting on a vehicle, used for removing snow and ice from outdoor surfaces, typically those serving transportation purposes. Although this term is often used to refer to vehicles mounting such devices, more accurately they are known as winter service vehicles, especially in areas that regularly receive large amounts of snow every year, or in specific environments such as airfields. In other cases, pickup trucks and front end loaders are outfitted with attachments to fulfill this purpose.  Some regions that do not frequently see snow may use graders to remove compacted snow and ice off the streets. Snowplows can also be mounted on rail cars or locomotives to clear railway tracks.

Usage

A snowplow works by using a blade to push snow to the side to clear it from a surface. Modern plows may include technology to make it easier to perform the work and stay on the road. These include Global Positioning System receivers, head-up displays and infrared cameras.

Large custom snowplows are commonly used at major airports in North America. These plows have oversized blades and additional equipment like a rotating sweeper broom (sometimes called jetblade) and blowers at the rear of the plow.

For sidewalks and narrow lanes small tractor plows (tracked or wheeled) are often used within Canada and the United States.

When snowfall accumulates above a certain height, snowplow operators may be seen clearing the main arteries first (designated as snow routes), in some cases for the exclusive use of emergency vehicles.

Underbody scrapers are sometimes mounted on vehicles in residential and urban settings, operating on principles similar to a road grader, but allowing greater weights and speed along with the carriage of a road treatment applicator.

Newer technology has allowed the use of articulated plow systems which can clear multiple divided highway lanes simultaneously; jurisdictions adopting this technology include the provinces of Alberta, British Columbia, New Brunswick, Ontario and Quebec in Canada, along with 21 states (Colorado, Connecticut, Delaware, Indiana, Kansas, Maine, Maryland, Massachusetts, Michigan, Minnesota, Missouri, Montana, New Hampshire, New York,  North Dakota, Ohio, Oregon, Pennsylvania, Tennessee, Utah and Wisconsin) in the US.

History 

The first snow plows were horse-drawn wedge-plows made of wood. The earliest reference found by the Oxford English Dictionary was written in 1792 in a description of New Hampshire:

With the advent of rail travel and later, the automobile, a number of inventors set about to improve existing snow plows. In the US, the "snow-clearer" is said to have been patented as early as the 1840s, for railways. The first snow plow ever built specifically for use with motor equipment was in 1913. It was manufactured by Good Roads Machinery in Kennett Square, PA. and was designed to meet the exacting requirements outlined by engineers of the New York City Street Cleaning Bureau.  Good Roads is therefore unofficially credited as the originator of the modern snow plow, though their horse drawn steel blade road graders were used to clear roads of snow as early as the company's founding in 1878 under their original name American Road Machinery.  Good Roads patented the first four-wheel grader in 1889 thus making it the first pull grading apparatus patented in the United States.  Unlike most early snow plow manufacturers, Good Roads continues to manufacture snow removal equipment today under the name Good Roads Godwin, now located in Dunn, North Carolina. In the early 1920s Good Roads often advertised in The American City magazine that "...three out of every four snow plows in use throughout the whole United States are Good Roads Champions." By the mid-1920s Good Roads was manufacturing snow plows of various shapes and sizes for use on a wide variety of motorized equipment. Other snow plow manufactures began to follow suit as motorized plows were proven more efficient than other methods of snow removal.

Carl Frink of Clayton, New York, USA was also an early manufacturer of truck-mounted snowplows.  His company, Frink Snowplows, now Frink-America, was founded by some accounts as early as 1920. For the winter of 1919, Carl H. Frink, owner of a tire and machine shop in Clayton (New York), manufactured and equipped a bus with a steel V-blade snowplow for Fred I. Dailey's Clayton to Watertown bus line. In 1920, Frink equipped a Linn halftrack with a snowplow and side-blades for F.W. Carpenter's Black River Bus Lines and started his snowplow business. The Linn Co. immediately started to equip their halftracks with snowplow and heavily promoted their superior traction; they dominated the eastern market until the 30s when the halftracks were supplanted by the much faster four-wheel drive trucks.

In 1923, the brothers Hans and Even Øveraasen of Norway constructed an early snowplow for use on cars. This proved to be the start of a tradition in snow-clearing equipment for roads, railways and airports, as well as the foundation of the company Øveraasen Snow Removal Systems.
  
Today snow plows are produced by numerous companies around the world and available for different kinds of vehicles such as service trucks, pickup trucks, SUVs and ATVs. They are installed using model specific or universal hardware and mount to the frame of the vehicle to ensure durable connection. There are manual, power and hydraulic operating snow plows. All necessary mounting hardware usually comes in set with a plow. Snow plow blades are available in various sizes depending on a vehicle type. Service trucks usually use a blade sized  and more.

Railway snowplows

In many countries, railway locomotives have small snowplows permanently attached to their bogies, which also serve as pilots. With others, the snowplow forms part of the obstacle deflector below the bufferbeam.  Bolt-on versions also exist, and these attach to the bufferbeam or front coupler.  However, larger snowplows exist, which tend to be conversions rather than purpose-built vehicles.  Steam locomotive tenders, large diesel locomotive bogies and various freight vehicles have been used, with the snowplow body mounted on the original frames. They are one-ended, with conventional coupling equipment on the inner end. In Canada purpose built snowplow cars (based on a box car with caboose cab located above and behind the blade) are in use in areas where there is a significant snow fall during winter periods (especially in Western Canada, Newfoundland and Northern Ontario). These cars were influenced by the Russell Plow from the United States and used in Canada in the 1880s. Most of the Russell type plows have been retired for smaller custom built railplow or snow blades attached to hopper cars or locomotives.

Conventional operation may see one or two locomotives running together with a snowplow at either end.  This enables a snow clearance train to reverse direction quickly if it gets stuck.  Alternatively, a single locomotive with bogie plows can act as a self-propelled snowplow by running light engine.

VIA Rail, among other railways, has integrated plow blades with the front pilots of their locomotive fleet to clear thinner accumulations of snow as trains run.

Self-propelled on-track steel and rubber tired "Hy-Rail" equipment can also be employed to remove snow from railroad tracks. The Pettibone Speed Swing loader and similar machines, both with and without hyrail wheels can be fitted with a large capacity snow bucket or a wedge plow to clear the tracks. Ballast regulators, machines designed to shape the profile of the crushed stone ballast that anchors the track in place, can be used without modification or refitted with purpose built snow blades, blowers and wings to clear snow from the right of way.

Locomotive propelled Jordan Ditcher/Spreaders are still sometimes used to plow especially deep snow in the US on the former Wisconsin Central railroad. These machines carry large main plows and hydraulic or air powered articulating wings to push snow far away from the tracks, sometimes past the next adjacent track to facilitate clearing snow from yards and sidings. These machines can also used to create ditches and plow the tracks clear of loose material during maintenance operations. Russell Plows are still in service at some locations, with large front wedge plows and shorter hinged air powered wings only suitable for plowing snow.

See also

Grader
Plow (disambiguation)
Rotary snowplow
Snow blower
Snow emergency
Snow pusher
Wedge Plow
Winter service vehicle

References

External links

 Digital Public Library of America. Items related to snowplows, various dates
  Seven minute video about the history of snowplows in the U.S. state of Maine

Plow
 
Commercial vehicles
Articles containing video clips